Alejandro López may refer to:
Alejandro López de Haro (1949–2010), Venezuelan photographer and stockbroker
Alejandro López (footballer) (born 1989), Argentine football defender
Alejandro López (racewalker) (born 1975), Mexican racewalker
Alejandro López (politician), Argentine politician
Álex López (footballer, born 1988), Spanish football midfielder
Álex López (footballer, born 1993), Spanish football striker
Álex López (footballer, born 1997), Spanish football midfielder

See also
Alex Lopez (disambiguation)
Alejandra López Noriega (born 1970), Mexican politician
Alexandra López (born 1989), Spanish football defender
Alexander López (born 1992), Honduran football attacking midfielder